Nebulosa hermani is a moth of the family Notodontidae first described by James S. Miller in 2008. It is restricted to the western side of the Ecuadorian Andes.

The length of the forewings is 13–15 mm for males and 13-15.5 mm for females. The ground color of the forewings is brown to light brown. The ground color of the hindwings is translucent white.

Etymology
The species is named in honor of Lee Herman, curator of Coleoptera at the American Museum of Natural History  and one of the world's leading experts on Staphylinidae.

References

Moths described in 2008
Notodontidae of South America